Dharmanath Prasad Sah is a Nepali politician and a current Deputy chairman of CPN (Unified Socialist). Sah is the former Minister for General Administration of Nepal.

He is also former member of Pratinidhi Sabha from Siraha 5.

Reference 

Year of birth missing (living people)
Living people
Communist Party of Nepal (Unified Socialist) politicians
Government ministers of Nepal
People from Siraha District
Members of the 2nd Nepalese Constituent Assembly